Meskanaw is a small community south west of Melfort, Saskatchewan. Meskanaw is the Cree word for trail or road.

History
The first settlers came to Meskanaw in the late 1890s. Mr. W. E. Traill was the first inhabitant of the town.

Demographics 

References

Designated places in Saskatchewan
Invergordon No. 430, Saskatchewan
Organized hamlets in Saskatchewan
Division No. 15, Saskatchewan